Rollin' with the Flow is the thirteenth studio album of American country music artist Mark Chesnutt. It was released on June 24, 2008. Its lead-off single and title track, a cover of Charlie Rich's Number One hit from 1977, peaked at #25 on the Billboard country charts in early 2008. "When You Love Her Like Crazy", "(Come on In) The Whiskey's Fine", "Things to Do in Wichita," and "Going On Later On" were also released, all of which failed to chart.

The fifth single serviced to radio, is "She Never Got Me Over You" which is the last song written by Keith Whitley.  Hank Cochran had held on to this song, until he offered it to Mark in 2007. The song was released to radio in March 2009. The song debuted on the Hot Country Songs chart at #60 on the chart dated April 11, 2009, and reached a peak of #49.

Track listing

Personnel
 Eddie Bayers - drums
 Jim "Moose" Brown - piano
 Mark Chesnutt - lead vocals
 Larry Franklin - fiddle
 Paul Franklin - steel guitar
 Wes Hightower - background vocals
 John Barlow Jarvis - piano
 B. James Lowry - acoustic guitar, gut string guitar
 Brent Mason - electric guitar
 Gordon Mote - piano
 Jimmy Ritchey - acoustic guitar, baritone guitar, electric guitar
 Lonnie Wilson - drums
 Glenn Worf - bass guitar
 Jonathan Yudkin - cello, string bass, viola, violin

Chart performance

References

External links
Mark Chesnutt introduces new album
Rollin' with the Flow: Cut by Cut

2008 albums
Lofton Creek Records albums
Mark Chesnutt albums
Albums produced by Jimmy Ritchey